Windy City Times is an LGBT newspaper in Chicago that published its first issue on September 26, 1985.

History
Windy City Times was founded in 1985 by Jeff McCourt, Bob Bearden, Drew Badanish and Tracy Baim, who started Sentury Publications to publish the paper. In 1987, Baim left Sentury Publications to found a new newspaper called Outlines. WCT and Outlines were the two primary LGBT newspapers in the region for more than 12 years. In 2000, Baim purchased Windy City Times from McCourt, and merged the two publications.

In 2018, Baim became Publisher of the Chicago Reader and remains as owner of Windy City Media Group.

Terri Klinsky is now Publisher, Andrew Davis is Executive Editor, Matt Simonette is Managing Editor, Kirk Williamson is Art Director and Ripley Caine is Business Manager. Long-time writers include Rex Wockner, Yvonne Zipter, Bob Roehr, Richard Knight Jr., Jonathan Abarbanel. Jean Albright is Director of New Media and Circulation. 

McCourt died in 2007.

Windy City Media Group announced on Sept. 9, 2020 that, as of Sept. 30, 2020, the biweekly print version will cease. News and feature coverage will continue digitally at www.windycitymediagroup.com.

The site has archived 70,000 articles from Windy City Times and other previous products including  Nightspots—a biweekly, four-color, glossy entertainment guide—and Identity, a monthly online magazine. WCMG has also produced a twice-weekly podcast, Windy City Queercast, online videos, and a weekly e-newsletter. All products are now archived at windycitytimes.com. 

Windy City Times is a member of the National Gay Newspaper Guild, and has received numerous honors for its work, both from journalism organizations and from the LGBT community. Awards include from the National Lesbian and Gay Journalists Association, the Peter Lisagor Awards, and the Studs Terkel Award for Baim. Among groups honoring WCMG and Baim: Chicago Gay and Lesbian Hall of Fame; ACLU of Illinois; Human Rights Campaign; NOW; March on Washington Chicago Committee; Dignity/Chicago; Affinity; Greater Chicago Committee; Association of Latin Men in Action; and more.

In 2017, journalist Gretchen Rachel Hammond was removed from her job after she published a story about three LGBT women who were expelled from a Gay Pride march for carrying a rainbow flag featuring a Jewish Star. Shortly after, she was hired as a reporter for Tablet.

In 2021, the newspaper won the Barbara Gittings Award for Excellence in LGBTQ Media at the 32nd GLAAD Media Awards.

References

External links

Windy City Media Group
Windy City Times Twitter

Free newspapers
LGBT culture in Chicago
LGBT-related newspapers published in the United States
Newspapers published in Chicago
Newspapers established in 1985
1985 establishments in Illinois
Inductees of the Chicago LGBT Hall of Fame